The Bambuseae are the most diverse tribe of bamboos in the grass family (Poaceae). They consist of woody species from tropical regions, including some giant bamboos. Their sister group are the small herbaceous bamboos from the tropics in tribe Olyreae, while the temperate woody bamboos (Arundinarieae) are more distantly related. The Bambuseae fall into two clades, corresponding to species from the Neotropics (subtribes Arthrostylidiinae, Chusqueinae, and Guaduinae) and from the Paleotropics (subtribes Bambusinae, Hickeliinae, Melocanninae, and Racemobambosinae).

Subtribes and genera
The 73 genera are placed in eleven subtribes:
 subtribe Arthrostylidiinae: 
Actinocladum, Alvimia, Arthrostylidium, Athroostachys, Atractantha, Aulonemia, Cambajuva, Colanthelia, Didymogonyx, Elytrostachys, Filgueirasia, Glaziophyton, Merostachys, Myriocladus, Rhipidocladum
 subtribe Bambusinae: 
Bambusa, Bonia, Cochinchinochloa, Dendrocalamus, Fimbribambusa, Gigantochloa,  Maclurochloa, Melocalamus, Neomicrocalamus, Oreobambos, Oxytenanthera, Phuphanochloa, Pseudobambusa, Pseudoxytenanthera, Soejatmia,  Thyrsostachys, Vietnamosasa, Yersinochloa
 subtribe Chusqueinae:
Chusquea
 subtribe Dinochloinae: 
Cyrtochloa, Dinochloa, Mullerochloa, Neololeba, Pinga, Parabambusa, Sphaerobambos
 subtribe Greslaniinae:
Greslania
 subtribe Guaduinae: 
Apoclada, Eremocaulon, Guadua, Olmeca, Otatea
 subtribe Hickeliinae:
Cathariostachys, Decaryochloa, Hickelia, Hitchcockella, Nastus, Perrierbambus, Sirochloa, Sokinochloa, Valiha
 subtribe Holttumochloinae:
Holttumochloa, Kinabaluchloa, Nianhochloa
 subtribe Melocanninae: 
Annamocalamus, Cephalostachyum, Davidsea, Melocanna, Neohouzeaua, Ochlandra, Pseudostachyum, Schizostachyum, Stapletonia
 subtribe Racemobambosinae: 
Chloothamnus, Racemobambos, Widjajachloa
 subtribe Temburongiinae:
Temburongia
 incertae sedis
Ruhooglandia, Temochloa

References

Poaceae tribes